Cooper Site may refer to:

Cooper Site (Lyme, Connecticut), listed on the National Register of Historic Places in New London County, Connecticut
Cooper Site (Onamia, Minnesota), listed on the National Register of Historic Places in Mille Lacs County, Minnesota